The 2004 World Wheelchair Curling Championship was held from January 19 to 24 in Sursee, Switzerland.

Teams

Group A

Group B

Round robin standings

Round robin results

Group A

Draw 1
Tuesday, January 20, 14:00

Draw 2
Tuesday, January 20, 19:00

Draw 3
Wednesday, January 21, 9:00

Draw 4
Wednesday, January 21, 14:00

Draw 5
Wednesday, January 21, 19:00

Draw 6
Thursday, January 22, 9:00

Draw 7
Thursday, January 22, 14:00

Group B

Draw 1
Tuesday, January 20, 19:00

Draw 2
Wednesday, January 21, 9:00

Draw 3
Wednesday, January 21, 19:00

Draw 4
Thursday, January 22, 9:00

Draw 5
Thursday, January 22, 14:00

Tiebreakers
Friday, January 23, 9:00

Switzerland advances to the playoffs.

Bulgaria moves to the ninth place classification game, while Norway moves to the eleventh place classification game.

Classification Games
Friday, January 23, 19:00
Fifth place

Seventh place

Ninth place

Eleventh place

Playoffs

Semifinals
Friday, January 23, 19:00

Bronze medal game
Saturday, January 24, 11:00

Gold medal game
Saturday, January 24, 11:00

External links

Results at Curlit.com

World Wheelchair Curling Championship
2007 in curling
2007 in Swiss sport
International curling competitions hosted by Switzerland
International sports competitions hosted by Switzerland